R.Rajasree is an Indian novelist who writes in the Malayalam language. She is a recipient of the Kerala Sahitya Akademi award of 2022 for her novel, Kalyaniyennum Dakshayaniyennum Perulla Randu Sthreekalude Katha.

Works
 2018: Nayikaanirmmathi Vazhiyum Porulum
 2018: Apasarppakaaghyanangal: Bhavanayum Rashtreeyavum
 2019: Kalyaniyennum Dakshayaniyennum Perulla Randu Sthreekalude Katha

Awards
 Kerala Sahitya Akademi award of 2022

References

External links
 ഫെയ്‌സ്ബുക്കില്‍ എഴുതിയ പേരില്ലാത്തുടര്‍ക്കഥ; 17 പതിപ്പുകള്‍, അക്കാദമി പുരസ്‌കാരം

Writers from Kerala
Malayalam-language writers
Malayalam novelists
Year of birth missing (living people)
Living people